Alfred "Alf" Middleton (birth unknown – death unknown) was an English professional rugby league footballer who played in the 1920s and 1930s.

Playing career

International honours
Alf Middleton won a cap for England while at Salford in 1931 against Wales, and won a cap for Great Britain while at Salford in 1929 against Australia.

Les Diables Rouges
Alf Middleton was one of the players who successfully toured in France with Salford in 1934, during which the Salford team earned the name "Les Diables Rouges", the seventeen players were; Joe Bradbury, Bob Brown, Aubrey Casewell, Paddy Dalton, Bert Day, Cliff Evans, Jack Feetham, George Harris, Barney Hudson, Emlyn Jenkins, Alf Middleton, Sammy Miller, Harold Osbaldestin, Les Pearson, Gus Risman, Billy Watkins and Billy Williams.

Championship final appearances
Alf Middleton played right-, i.e. number 12, in Salford's 3-15 defeat by Wigan in the Championship Final during the 1933–34 season Final at Wilderspool Stadium, Warrington on Saturday 28 April 1934.

County Cup Final appearances
About Alf Middleton's time, there was Salford's 2-15 defeat by Warrington in the 1929 Lancashire Cup Final during the 1929–30 season at Central Park, Wigan on Saturday 23 November 1929, the 10-8 victory over Swinton in the 1931 Lancashire Cup Final during the 1931–32 season at The Cliff, Broughton, Salford on Saturday 21 November 1931, the 21-12 victory over Wigan in the 1934 Lancashire Cup Final during the 1934–35 season at Station Road, Swinton on Saturday 20 October 1934, the 15-7 victory over Wigan in the 1935 Lancashire Cup Final during the 1935–36 season at Wilderspool Stadium, Warrington on Saturday 19 October 1935, and the 5-2 victory over Wigan in the 1936 Lancashire Cup Final during the 1936–37 season at Wilderspool Stadium, Warrington on Saturday 17 October 1936.

References

External links
Dedicated To Salford Rugby League Football Club

England national rugby league team players
English rugby league players
Great Britain national rugby league team players
Place of death missing
Rugby league players from Warwickshire
Rugby league second-rows
Salford Red Devils captains
Salford Red Devils players
Sportspeople from Nuneaton
Year of birth missing
Year of death missing